Michelle Zatlyn is co-founder, president, and chief operating officer of the cybersecurity firm Cloudflare. She also serves on the company's board of directors.

Early life and education 
Zatlyn was born and raised in Prince Albert, Saskatchewan, Canada.

She graduated from McGill University with a Bachelor of Science degree in chemistry in 2001 and then got a Master of Business Administration from Harvard Business School.

Career 
After working at Google and Toshiba, Zatlyn joined the startup I Love Rewards (later Achievers), a global employee rewards program.

Zatlyn co-founded Cloudflare with Harvard Business School classmates Matthew Prince and Lee Holloway in 2009. She sits on Cloudflare's board and serves as the company's president and COO.

In speaking about her co-founding of Cloudflare, she states:When we came up with Cloudflare, I knew nothing about internet security, but I care a lot about liking what I'm doing. I knew if I could help create internet security, that's something I could work hard for and be proud [of]; 10 years later, we have 165 data centres, 12 million domains and more than 800 employees.Zatlyn was appointed to the board of directors for Australian software company, Atlassian, in September 2021. She is a member of the Cybersecurity team of the Aspen Institute.

Awards 
Zatlyn was named as one of Forbes magazine's "40 Under 40" (2017) and "50 Self-Made Women" (2021); she was also nominated as C100's "Icon of Canadian Entrepreneurship" (2019). As of 2021, she is a member of the Young Global Leaders of the World Economic Forum.

References

External links 
 Cloudflare’s Michelle Zatlyn on getting funding for crazy ideas - TechCrunch Disrupt 2020 interview - September 17, 2020

Year of birth missing (living people)
Living people
McGill University alumni
Harvard Business School alumni
Chief operating officers
Women corporate executives
Canadian women business executives
World Economic Forum Young Global Leaders
Cloudflare people
21st-century businesswomen
21st-century Canadian businesspeople
21st-century Canadian businesswomen
Forbes lists